Payton Terrell Willis (born January 31, 1998) is an American basketball player for Hapoel Gilboa Galil in the Israeli Basketball Premier League. He played college basketball for the Vanderbilt Commodores, the Minnesota Golden Gophers of the Big Ten Conference, and the College of Charleston Cougars.

Early life
He is the son of Curtis Willis and Christy Duggar, and his hometown is Fayetteville, Arkansas.

Willis attended Fayetteville High School ('16).  In his sophomore season, he was named all-conference and all-state. In his junior season, he averaged 15.9 points, 3.6 rebounds, 3.5 assists, and 1.5 steals per game while shooting 44.7% from three-point range. He was again named all-conference and all-state.

College career

In college Willis played basketball for the Vanderbilt Commodores, the Minnesota Golden Gophers of the Big Ten Conference, and the College of Charleston Cougars.

He played for Vanderbilt in 2016–18. Willis averaged 5.1 points per game. He sat out 2018–19 in accordance with NCAA transfer rules.

Willis played for Minnesota in 2019–20. He averaged 11.8 points per game. The Covid pandemic ended the team's season early.

He played for Charleston as a graduate transfer in 2020–21, where Willis was a hospitality and tourism management major, and was Preseason All-Colonial Athletic Association Honorable Mention. He started every game and averaged 15.9 points per game, 3.1 assists per game (9th in the Colonial Athletic Association), and 1.4 steals per game (5th), shot 40% from 3-point range, and was team co-captain.

Willis played for Minnesota ('22) again in 2021–22, as he was allowed to play a fifth season - along with other athletes - given that the pandemic had shortened his earlier seasons, and shifted from shooting guard to point guard. He was team captain and averaged 17.5 points per game and 4.3 assists per game (8th in the Big Ten), while leading the Big Ten in 3-point percentage (.428; the sixth best in team history). In 2022 he was Asheville Championship MVP, All-Big Ten Honorable Mention (Coaches), and All-Big Ten Honorable Mention (Media).

Professional career
In July 2022 he played in the Golden State Warriors Summer League.

Willis plays in 2022 for Hapoel Gilboa Galil in the Israeli Basketball Premier League, Israel's highest level basketball league, having signed a contract with the team in July 2022.

References

External links
College of Charleston Cougars bio
Minnesota Golden Gophers bio
Vanderbilt Commodores bio

1998 births
Living people
American men's basketball players
African-American basketball players
American expatriate basketball people in Israel
Basketball players from Arkansas
College of Charleston Cougars men's basketball players
Guards (basketball)
Hapoel Gilboa Galil Elyon players
Israeli Basketball Premier League players
Minnesota Golden Gophers men's basketball players
Sportspeople from Fayetteville, Arkansas
Vanderbilt Commodores men's basketball players
21st-century African-American sportspeople